St Faith, Farmcote is a chapel of ease in Farmcote, Gloucestershire, 2 miles west-north-west of Temple Guiting. It has been designated by English Heritage as a Grade I listed building.

The chapel is located in the small hamlet of Farmcote in the Cotswolds, near Winchcombe. The original building was Saxon; the only remains of the early church are the Saxo-Norman nave, the remains of a doorway and a double bellcote.

References

Church of England church buildings in Gloucestershire
Diocese of Gloucester
Grade I listed churches in Gloucestershire
Temple Guiting